Cornflower blue is a shade of medium-to-light blue containing relatively little green. This hue was one of the favorites of the Dutch painter Johannes Vermeer.

The most valuable blue sapphires are called cornflower blue, having a medium-dark violet-blue tone.

Uses

Robert Boyle
Robert Boyle reported a blue dye produced from the cornflower. This was also called Boyle's Blue and Cyan Blue. This dye color, however, was not widely commercialized.

X11
Cornflower blue is a defined color in the X Window (X11) color scheme. As such, it is a color available as a named color for webpages.

HTML
CornFlowerBlue is an HTML color name, its hexadecimal code is #6495ED.

Crayola
Cornflower is a Crayola color with hexadecimal code #93CCEA. It was originally introduced in 1958, in the box of 48 crayons. The color is also called light cornflower.

RAL
Cornflower Blue RAL code is RAL 270 50 40

Microsoft XNA
Cornflower blue is the default clear color used in the XNA framework.

Bavarian Infantry Uniform Color
Coat color of Bavarian infantry in the early 19th Century especially found in the Napoleonic Era.

In popular culture
The German popular song "Kornblumenblau" (literally "cornflower blue") humorously glorifies extreme drunkenness, blau being German slang for "drunk" and cornflower blue being an intense shade of the color.

In the novel and movie Fight Club, the protagonist's manager is obsessed with cornflower blue, wearing cornflower blue ties and asking a software developer if an icon can be changed to cornflower blue.

See also
List of colors

References

Shades of azure
Shades of blue